Shinhopple is a hamlet in Delaware County, New York, United States. Shinhopple had a post office until July 31, 1993.

References

Hamlets in Delaware County, New York
Hamlets in New York (state)